This is a list of the bird species recorded in South Sudan. The avifauna of South Sudan include a total of 831 species.

This list's taxonomic treatment (designation and sequence of orders, families and species) and nomenclature (common and scientific names) follow the conventions of The Clements Checklist of Birds of the World, 2022 edition. The family accounts at the beginning of each heading reflect this taxonomy, as do the species counts found in each family account. Introduced and accidental species are included in the total counts for South Sudan.

The following tags have been used to highlight several categories. The commonly occurring native species do not fall into any of these categories.

 (A) Accidental - a species that rarely or accidentally occurs in South Sudan
 (E) Endemic - a species endemic to South Sudan
 (I) Introduced - a species introduced to South Sudan as a consequence, direct or indirect, of human actions

Ostriches
Order: StruthioniformesFamily: Struthionidae

Common ostrich, Struthio camelus

Ducks, geese, and waterfowl
Order: AnseriformesFamily: Anatidae

Anatidae includes the ducks and most duck-like waterfowl, such as geese and swans. These birds are adapted to an aquatic existence with webbed feet, flattened bills, and feathers that are excellent at shedding water due to an oily coating.

White-faced whistling-duck, Dendrocygna viduata
Fulvous whistling-duck, Dendrocygna bicolor
White-backed duck, Thalassornis leuconotus (A)
Knob-billed duck, Sarkidiornis melanotos
Hartlaub's duck, Pteronetta hartlaubii (A)
Egyptian goose, Alopochen aegyptiacus
Ruddy shelduck, Tadorna ferruginea (A)
Spur-winged goose, Plectropterus gambensis
African pygmy-goose, Nettapus auritus
Garganey, Spatula querquedula
Blue-billed teal, Spatula hottentota
Northern shoveler, Spatula clypeata
Eurasian wigeon, Mareca penelope
African black duck, Anas sparsa
Mallard, Anas platyrhynchos (A)
Red-billed duck, Anas erythrorhyncha (A)
Northern pintail, Anas acuta
Green-winged teal, Anas crecca
Southern pochard, Netta erythrophthalma (A)
Ferruginous duck, Aythya nyroca
Tufted duck, Aythya fuligula

Guineafowl
Order: GalliformesFamily: Numididae

Guineafowl are a group of African, seed-eating, ground-nesting birds that resemble partridges, but with featherless heads and spangled grey plumage.

Helmeted guineafowl, Numida meleagris
Western crested guineafowl, Guttera verreauxi

New World quail
Order: GalliformesFamily: Odontophoridae

Despite their family's common name, this species and one other are native to Africa.

 Stone partridge, Ptilopachus petrosus

Pheasants, grouse, and allies
Order: GalliformesFamily: Phasianidae

The Phasianidae are a family of terrestrial birds which consists of quails, snowcocks, francolins, spurfowls, tragopans, monals, pheasants, peafowls and jungle fowls. In general, they are plump (although they vary in size) and have broad, relatively short wings.

Latham's francolin, Peliperdix lathami (A)
Crested francolin, Ortygornis sephaena
Schlegel's francolin, Campocolinus schlegelii (A)
Orange River francolin, Scleroptila gutturalis (A)
Blue quail, Synoicus adansonii
Common quail, Coturnix coturnix
Harlequin quail, Coturnix delegorguei
Scaly francolin, Pternistis squamatus
Heuglin's francolin, Pternistis icterorhynchus
Clapperton's francolin, Pternistis clappertoni
Yellow-necked francolin, Pternistis leucoscepus

Flamingos
Order: PhoenicopteriformesFamily: Phoenicopteridae

Flamingos filter-feed on shellfish and algae. Their oddly shaped beaks are specially adapted to separate mud and silt from the food they consume and, uniquely, are used upside-down.

Greater flamingo, Phoenicopterus roseus

Grebes
Order: PodicipediformesFamily: Podicipedidae

Grebes are small to medium-large freshwater diving birds. They have lobed toes and are excellent swimmers and divers. However, they have their feet placed far back on the body, making them quite ungainly on land.

Little grebe, Tachybaptus ruficollis

Pigeons and doves
Order: ColumbiformesFamily: Columbidae

Pigeons and doves are stout-bodied birds with short necks and short slender bills with a fleshy cere.

Rock pigeon, Columba livia (I)
Speckled pigeon, Columba guinea
Afep pigeon, Columba unicincta (A)
Rameron pigeon, Columba arquatrix
Delegorgue's pigeon, Columba delegorguei 
Bronze-naped pigeon, Columba iriditorques (A)
Lemon dove, Columba larvata
White-naped pigeon, Columba albinucha (A)
European turtle-dove, Streptopelia turtur
Dusky turtle-dove, Streptopelia lugens
Mourning collared-dove, Streptopelia decipiens
Red-eyed dove, Streptopelia semitorquata
Ring-necked dove, Streptopelia capicola
Vinaceous dove, Streptopelia vinacea
Laughing dove, Streptopelia senegalensis
Emerald-spotted wood-dove, Turtur chalcospilos
Black-billed wood-dove, Turtur abyssinicus
Tambourine dove, Turtur tympanistria
Namaqua dove, Oena capensis
Bruce's green-pigeon, Treron waalia
African green-pigeon, Treron calva

Sandgrouse
Order: PterocliformesFamily: Pteroclidae

Sandgrouse have small, pigeon-like heads and necks, but sturdy compact bodies. They have long pointed wings and sometimes tails and a fast direct flight. Flocks fly to watering holes at dawn and dusk. Their legs are feathered down to the toes.

Chestnut-bellied sandgrouse, Pterocles exustus
Lichtenstein's sandgrouse, Pterocles lichtensteinii
Four-banded sandgrouse, Pterocles quadricinctus

Bustards
Order: OtidiformesFamily: Otididae

Bustards are large terrestrial birds mainly associated with dry open country and steppes in the Old World. They are omnivorous and nest on the ground. They walk steadily on strong legs and big toes, pecking for food as they go. They have long broad wings with "fingered" wingtips and striking patterns in flight. Many have interesting mating displays.

Arabian bustard, Ardeotis arabs
Denham's bustard, Neotis denhami (A)
White-bellied bustard, Eupodotis senegalensis
Buff-crested bustard, Eupodotis gindiana
Black-bellied bustard, Lissotis melanogaster
Hartlaub's bustard, Lissotis hartlaubii (A)

Turacos
Order: MusophagiformesFamily: Musophagidae

The turacos, plantain eaters and go-away-birds make up the bird family Musophagidae. They are medium-sized arboreal birds. The turacos and plantain eaters are brightly coloured, usually in blue, green or purple. The go-away birds are mostly grey and white.

Great blue turaco, Corythaeola cristata
Black-billed turaco, Tauraco schuettii (A)
White-crested turaco, Tauraco leucolophus
White-cheeked turaco, Tauraco leucotis (A)
Ross's turaco, Musophaga rossae (A)
White-bellied go-away-bird, Corythaixoides leucogaster
Eastern plantain-eater, Crinifer zonurus

Cuckoos and anis
Order: CuculiformesFamily: Cuculidae

The family Cuculidae includes cuckoos, roadrunners and anis. These birds are of variable size with slender bodies, long tails and strong legs. The Old World cuckoos are brood parasites.

Senegal coucal, Centropus senegalensis (A)
Blue-headed coucal, Centropus monachus
White-browed coucal, Centropus superciliosus
Black coucal, Centropus grillii (A)
Blue malkoha, Ceuthmochares aereus
Great spotted cuckoo, Clamator glandarius
Levaillant's cuckoo, Clamator levaillantii
Pied cuckoo, Clamator jacobinus
Thick-billed cuckoo, Pachycoccyx audeberti (A)
Dideric cuckoo, Chrysococcyx caprius
Klaas's cuckoo, Chrysococcyx klaas
Yellow-throated cuckoo, Chrysococcyx flavigularis (A)
African emerald cuckoo, Chrysococcyx cupreus
Black cuckoo, Cuculus clamosus
Red-chested cuckoo, Cuculus solitarius
African cuckoo, Cuculus gularis (A)
Common cuckoo, Cuculus canorus

Nightjars and allies
Order: CaprimulgiformesFamily: Caprimulgidae

Nightjars are medium-sized nocturnal birds that usually nest on the ground. They have long wings, short legs and very short bills. Most have small feet, of little use for walking, and long pointed wings. Their soft plumage is camouflaged to resemble bark or leaves.

Pennant-winged nightjar, Caprimulgus vexillarius
Standard-winged nightjar, Caprimulgus longipennis
Eurasian nightjar, Caprimulgus europaeus (A)
Sombre nightjar, Caprimulgus fraenatus (A)
Egyptian nightjar, Caprimulgus aegyptius
Donaldson-Smith's nightjar, Caprimulgus donaldsoni
Fiery-necked nightjar, Caprimulgus pectoralis
Montane nightjar, Caprimulgus poliocephalus
Swamp nightjar, Caprimulgus natalensis (A)
Plain nightjar, Caprimulgus inornatus
Star-spotted nightjar, Caprimulgus stellatus (A)
Freckled nightjar, Caprimulgus tristigma (A)
Long-tailed nightjar, Caprimulgus climacurus
Slender-tailed nightjar, Caprimulgus clarus

Swifts
Order: CaprimulgiformesFamily: Apodidae

Swifts are small birds which spend the majority of their lives flying. These birds have very short legs and never settle voluntarily on the ground, perching instead only on vertical surfaces. Many swifts have long swept-back wings which resemble a crescent or boomerang.

Scarce swift, Schoutedenapus myoptilus (A)
Alpine swift, Apus melba
Mottled swift, Apus aequatorialis
Common swift, Apus apus
Pallid swift, Apus pallidus (A)
Little swift, Apus affinis
White-rumped swift, Apus caffer
African palm-swift, Cypsiurus parvus

Flufftails
Order: GruiformesFamily: Sarothruridae

The flufftails are a small family of ground-dwelling birds found only in Madagascar and sub-Saharan Africa.

White-spotted flufftail, Sarothrura pulchra (A)
Buff-spotted flufftail, Sarothrura elegans
Striped flufftail, Sarothrura affinis (A)

Rails, gallinules, and coots
Order: GruiformesFamily: Rallidae

Rallidae is a large family of small to medium-sized birds which includes the rails, crakes, coots and gallinules. Typically they inhabit dense vegetation in damp environments near lakes, swamps or rivers. In general they are shy and secretive birds, making them difficult to observe. Most species have strong legs and long toes which are well adapted to soft uneven surfaces. They tend to have short, rounded wings and to be weak fliers.

African rail, Rallus caerulescens (A)
Corn crake, Crex crex (A)
African crake, Crex egregia (A)
Spotted crake, Porzana porzana
Lesser moorhen, Paragallinula angulata (A)
Allen's gallinule, Porphyrio alleni
African swamphen, Porphyrio madagascariensis (A)
Black crake, Zapornia flavirostris
Little crake, Zapornia parva

Cranes
Order: GruiformesFamily: Gruidae

Cranes are large, long-legged and long-necked birds. Unlike the similar-looking but unrelated herons, cranes fly with necks outstretched, not pulled back. Most have elaborate and noisy courting displays or "dances".

Gray crowned-crane, Balearica regulorum (A)
Black crowned-crane, Balearica pavonina
Demoiselle crane, Anthropoides virgo
Common crane, Grus grus

Thick-knees
Order: CharadriiformesFamily: Burhinidae

The thick-knees are a group of largely tropical waders in the family Burhinidae. They are found worldwide within the tropical zone, with some species also breeding in temperate Europe and Australia. They are medium to large waders with strong black or yellow-black bills, large yellow eyes and cryptic plumage. Despite being classed as waders, most species have a preference for arid or semi-arid habitats.

Senegal thick-knee, Burhinus senegalensis
Spotted thick-knee, Burhinus capensis

Egyptian plover
Order: CharadriiformesFamily: Pluvianidae

The Egyptian plover is found across equatorial Africa and along the Nile River.

Egyptian plover, Pluvianus aegyptius

Stilts and avocets
Order: CharadriiformesFamily: Recurvirostridae

Recurvirostridae is a family of large wading birds, which includes the avocets and stilts. The avocets have long legs and long up-curved bills. The stilts have extremely long legs and long, thin, straight bills.

Black-winged stilt, Himantopus himantopus
Pied avocet, Recurvirostra avosetta

Plovers and lapwings
Order: CharadriiformesFamily: Charadriidae

The family Charadriidae includes the plovers, dotterels and lapwings. They are small to medium-sized birds with compact bodies, short, thick necks and long, usually pointed, wings. They are found in open country worldwide, mostly in habitats near water.

Black-bellied plover, Pluvialis squatarola
Long-toed lapwing, Vanellus crassirostris (A)
Spur-winged lapwing, Vanellus spinosus
Black-headed lapwing, Vanellus tectus
White-headed lapwing, Vanellus albiceps (A)
Crowned lapwing, Vanellus coronatus
Wattled lapwing, Vanellus senegallus
White-tailed lapwing, Vanellus leucurus
Lesser sand-plover, Charadrius mongolus
Caspian plover, Charadrius asiaticus
Kittlitz's plover, Charadrius pecuarius
Kentish plover, Charadrius alexandrinus (A)
Common ringed plover, Charadrius hiaticula
Little ringed plover, Charadrius dubius
Three-banded plover, Charadrius tricollaris
Forbes's plover, Charadrius forbesi

Painted-snipes
Order: CharadriiformesFamily: Rostratulidae

Painted-snipes are short-legged, long-billed birds similar in shape to the true snipes, but more brightly coloured.

Greater painted-snipe, Rostratula benghalensis (A)

Jacanas
Order: CharadriiformesFamily: Jacanidae

The jacanas are a group of tropical waders in the family Jacanidae. They are found throughout the tropics. They are identifiable by their huge feet and claws which enable them to walk on floating vegetation in the shallow lakes that are their preferred habitat.

Lesser jacana, Microparra capensis (A)
African jacana, Actophilornis africanus

Sandpipers and allies
Order: CharadriiformesFamily: Scolopacidae

Scolopacidae is a large diverse family of small to medium-sized shorebirds including the sandpipers, curlews, godwits, shanks, tattlers, woodcocks, snipes, dowitchers and phalaropes. The majority of these species eat small invertebrates picked out of the mud or soil. Variation in length of legs and bills enables multiple species to feed in the same habitat, particularly on the coast, without direct competition for food.

Eurasian curlew, Numenius arquata
Black-tailed godwit, Limosa limosa
Ruddy turnstone, Arenaria interpres
Ruff, Calidris pugnax
Broad-billed sandpiper, Calidris falcinellus (A)
Curlew sandpiper, Calidris ferruginea
Temminck's stint, Calidris temminckii
Sanderling, Calidris alba (A)
Dunlin, Calidris alpina
Little stint, Calidris minuta
Jack snipe, Lymnocryptes minimus
Great snipe, Gallinago media (A)
Common snipe, Gallinago gallinago
African snipe, Gallinago nigripennis
Terek sandpiper, Xenus cinereus
Common sandpiper, Actitis hypoleucos
Green sandpiper, Tringa ochropus
Spotted redshank, Tringa erythropus
Common greenshank, Tringa nebularia
Marsh sandpiper, Tringa stagnatilis
Wood sandpiper, Tringa glareola
Common redshank, Tringa totanus

Buttonquail
Order: CharadriiformesFamily: Turnicidae

The buttonquail are small, drab, running birds which resemble the true quails. The female is the brighter of the sexes and initiates courtship. The male incubates the eggs and tends the young.

Small buttonquail, Turnix sylvatica
Quail-plover, Ortyxelos meiffrenii (A)

Pratincoles and coursers
Order: CharadriiformesFamily: Glareolidae

Glareolidae is a family of wading birds comprising the pratincoles, which have short legs, long pointed wings and long forked tails, and the coursers, which have long legs, short wings and long, pointed bills which curve downwards.

Cream-colored courser, Cursorius cursor
Somali courser, Cursorius somalensis
Temminck's courser, Cursorius temminckii (A)
Three-banded courser, Rhinoptilus cinctus (A)
Bronze-winged courser, Rhinoptilus chalcopterus (A)
Collared pratincole, Glareola pratincola
Black-winged pratincole, Glareola nordmanni
Rock pratincole, Glareola nuchalis (A)

Gulls, terns, and skimmers
Order: CharadriiformesFamily: Laridae

Laridae is a family of medium to large seabirds, the gulls, terns, and skimmers. They are typically grey or white, often with black markings on the head or wings. They have stout, longish bills and webbed feet. Terns are a group of generally medium to large seabirds typically with grey or white plumage, often with black markings on the head. Most terns hunt fish by diving but some pick insects off the surface of fresh water. Terns are generally long-lived birds, with several species known to live in excess of 30 years. Skimmers are a small family of tropical tern-like birds. They have an elongated lower mandible which they use to feed by flying low over the water surface and skimming the water for small fish.

Gray-hooded gull, Chroicocephalus cirrocephalus (A)
Black-headed gull, Chroicocephalus ridibundus
Lesser black-backed gull, Larus fuscus (A)
Gull-billed tern, Gelochelidon nilotica
Caspian tern, Hydroprogne caspia
White-winged tern, Chlidonias leucopterus
Whiskered tern, Chlidonias hybrida
African skimmer, Rynchops flavirostris

Storks
Order: CiconiiformesFamily: Ciconiidae

Storks are large, long-legged, long-necked, wading birds with long, stout bills. Storks are mute, but bill-clattering is an important mode of communication at the nest. Their nests can be large and may be reused for many years. Many species are migratory.

African openbill, Anastomus lamelligerus
Black stork, Ciconia nigra
Abdim's stork, Ciconia abdimii
African woolly-necked stork, Ciconia microscelis
White stork, Ciconia ciconia
Saddle-billed stork, Ephippiorhynchus senegalensis
Marabou stork, Leptoptilos crumenifer
Yellow-billed stork, Mycteria ibis

Anhingas
Order: SuliformesFamily: Anhingidae

Anhingas or darters are often called "snake-birds" because of their long thin neck, which gives a snake-like appearance when they swim with their bodies submerged. The males have black and dark-brown plumage, an erectile crest on the nape and a larger bill than the female. The females have much paler plumage especially on the neck and underparts. The darters have completely webbed feet and their legs are short and set far back on the body. Their plumage is somewhat permeable, like that of cormorants, and they spread their wings to dry after diving.

African darter, Anhinga melanogaster

Cormorants and shags
Order: SuliformesFamily: Phalacrocoracidae

Phalacrocoracidae is a family of medium to large coastal, fish-eating seabirds that includes cormorants and shags. Plumage colouration varies, with the majority having mainly dark plumage, some species being black-and-white and a few being colourful.

Long-tailed cormorant, Microcarbo africanus
Great cormorant, Phalacrocorax carbo (A)

Pelicans
Order: PelecaniformesFamily: Pelecanidae

Pelicans are large water birds with a distinctive pouch under their beak. As with other members of the order Pelecaniformes, they have webbed feet with four toes.

Great white pelican, Pelecanus onocrotalus
Pink-backed pelican, Pelecanus rufescens

Shoebill
Order: PelecaniformesFamily: Balaenicipididae

The shoebill is a large bird related to the storks. It derives its name from its massive shoe-shaped bill.

Shoebill, Balaeniceps rex

Hammerkop
Order: PelecaniformesFamily: Scopidae

The hammerkop is a medium-sized bird with a long shaggy crest. The shape of its head with a curved bill and crest at the back is reminiscent of a hammer, hence its name. Its plumage is drab-brown all over.

Hamerkop, Scopus umbretta

Herons, egrets, and bitterns
Order: PelecaniformesFamily: Ardeidae

The family Ardeidae contains the bitterns, herons and egrets. Herons and egrets are medium to large wading birds with long necks and legs. Bitterns tend to be shorter necked and more wary. Members of Ardeidae fly with their necks retracted, unlike other long-necked birds such as storks, ibises and spoonbills.

Little bittern, Ixobrychus minutus
Dwarf bittern, Ixobrychus sturmii
Gray heron, Ardea cinerea
Black-headed heron, Ardea melanocephala
Goliath heron, Ardea goliath
Purple heron, Ardea purpurea
Great egret, Ardea alba
Intermediate egret, Ardea intermedia
Little egret, Egretta garzetta
Black heron, Egretta ardesiaca
Cattle egret, Bubulcus ibis
Squacco heron, Ardeola ralloides
Striated heron, Butorides striata
Black-crowned night-heron, Nycticorax nycticorax
White-backed night-heron, Gorsachius leuconotus

Ibises and spoonbills
Order: PelecaniformesFamily: Threskiornithidae

Threskiornithidae is a family of large terrestrial and wading birds which includes the ibises and spoonbills. They have long, broad wings with 11 primary and about 20 secondary feathers. They are strong fliers and despite their size and weight, very capable soarers.

Glossy ibis, Plegadis falcinellus
African sacred ibis, Threskiornis aethiopicus
Hadada ibis, Bostrychia hagedash
Eurasian spoonbill, Platalea leucorodia (A)
African spoonbill, Platalea alba

Secretarybird
Order: AccipitriformesFamily: Sagittariidae

The secretarybird is a bird of prey in the order Accipitriformes but is easily distinguished from other raptors by its long crane-like legs.

Secretarybird, Sagittarius serpentarius

Osprey
Order: AccipitriformesFamily: Pandionidae

The family Pandionidae contains only one species, the osprey. The osprey is a medium-large raptor which is a specialist fish-eater with a worldwide distribution.

Osprey, Pandion haliaetus

Hawks, eagles, and kites
Order: AccipitriformesFamily: Accipitridae

Accipitridae is a family of birds of prey, which includes hawks, eagles, kites, harriers and Old World vultures. These birds have powerful hooked beaks for tearing flesh from their prey, strong legs, powerful talons and keen eyesight.

Black-winged kite, Elanus caeruleus
Scissor-tailed kite, Chelictinia riocourii
African harrier-hawk, Polyboroides typus
Palm-nut vulture, Gypohierax angolensis
Egyptian vulture, Neophron percnopterus
European honey-buzzard, Pernis apivorus
African cuckoo-hawk, Aviceda cuculoides (A)
White-headed vulture, Trigonoceps occipitalis
Lappet-faced vulture, Torgos tracheliotos
Hooded vulture, Necrosyrtes monachus
White-backed vulture, Gyps africanus
Rüppell's griffon, Gyps rueppelli
Bateleur, Terathopius ecaudatus
Short-toed snake-eagle, Circaetus gallicus
Beaudouin's snake-eagle, Circaetus beaudouini
Black-chested snake-eagle, Circaetus pectoralis
Brown snake-eagle, Circaetus cinereus
Banded snake-eagle, Circaetus cinerascens
Bat hawk, Macheiramphus alcinus (A)
Crowned eagle, Stephanoaetus coronatus (A)
Martial eagle, Polemaetus bellicosus (A)
Long-crested eagle, Lophaetus occipitalis
Lesser spotted eagle, Clanga pomarina
Wahlberg's eagle, Hieraaetus wahlbergi
Booted eagle, Hieraaetus pennatus
Ayres's hawk-eagle, Hieraaetus ayresii (A)
Tawny eagle, Aquila rapax
Steppe eagle, Aquila nipalensis
Verreaux's eagle, Aquila verreauxii
African hawk-eagle, Aquila spilogaster (A)
Lizard buzzard, Kaupifalco monogrammicus (A)
Dark chanting-goshawk, Melierax metabates
Eastern chanting-goshawk, Melierax poliopterus (A)
Gabar goshawk, Micronisus gabar
Grasshopper buzzard, Butastur rufipennis
Eurasian marsh-harrier, Circus aeruginosus
African marsh-harrier, Circus ranivorus (A)
Pallid harrier, Circus macrourus
Montagu's harrier, Circus pygargus
African goshawk, Accipiter tachiro (A)
Shikra, Accipiter badius
Levant sparrowhawk, Accipiter brevipes
Little sparrowhawk, Accipiter minullus (A)
Eurasian sparrowhawk, Accipiter nisus
Rufous-breasted sparrowhawk, Accipiter rufiventris (A)
Black goshawk, Accipiter melanoleucus
Long-tailed hawk, Urotriorchis macrourus (A)
Black kite, Milvus migrans
African fish-eagle, Haliaeetus vocifer
Common buzzard, Buteo buteo
Mountain buzzard, Buteo oreophilus (A)
Long-legged buzzard, Buteo rufinus
Red-necked buzzard, Buteo auguralis
Augur buzzard, Buteo augur

Barn-owls
Order: StrigiformesFamily: Tytonidae

Barn-owls are medium to large owls with large heads and characteristic heart-shaped faces. They have long strong legs with powerful talons.

Barn owl, Tyto alba

Owls
Order: StrigiformesFamily: Strigidae

The typical owls are small to large solitary nocturnal birds of prey. They have large forward-facing eyes and ears, a hawk-like beak and a conspicuous circle of feathers around each eye called a facial disk.

Eurasian scops-owl, Otus scops
African scops-owl, Otus senegalensis
Northern white-faced owl, Ptilopsis leucotis
Grayish eagle-owl, Bubo cinerascens
Verreaux's eagle-owl, Bubo lacteus
Pel's fishing-owl, Scotopelia peli
Pearl-spotted owlet, Glaucidium perlatum
African wood-owl, Strix woodfordii
Marsh owl, Asio capensis

Mousebirds
Order: ColiiformesFamily: Coliidae

The mousebirds are slender greyish or brown birds with soft, hairlike body feathers and very long thin tails. They are arboreal and scurry through the leaves like rodents in search of berries, fruit and buds. They are acrobatic and can feed upside down. All species have strong claws and reversible outer toes. They also have crests and stubby bills.

Speckled mousebird, Colius striatus
Blue-naped mousebird, Urocolius macrourus

Trogons
Order: TrogoniformesFamily: Trogonidae

The family Trogonidae includes trogons and quetzals. Found in tropical woodlands worldwide, they feed on insects and fruit, and their broad bills and weak legs reflect their diet and arboreal habits. Although their flight is fast, they are reluctant to fly any distance. Trogons have soft, often colourful, feathers with distinctive male and female plumage.

Narina trogon, Apaloderma narina

Hoopoes
Order: BucerotiformesFamily: Upupidae

Hoopoes have black, white and orangey-pink colouring with a large erectile crest on their head.

Eurasian hoopoe, Upupa epops

Woodhoopoes and scimitarbills
Order: BucerotiformesFamily: Phoeniculidae

The woodhoopoes are related to the kingfishers, rollers and hoopoes. They most resemble the hoopoes with their long curved bills, used to probe for insects, and short rounded wings. However, they differ in that they have metallic plumage, often blue, green or purple, and lack an erectile crest.

Green woodhoopoe, Phoeniculus purpureus
White-headed woodhoopoe, Phoeniculus bollei
Black scimitarbill, Rhinopomastus aterrimus
Abyssinian scimitarbill, Rhinopomastus minor

Ground-hornbills
Order: BucerotiformesFamily: Bucorvidae

The ground-hornbills are terrestrial birds which feed almost entirely on insects, other birds, snakes, and amphibians.

Abyssinian ground-hornbill, Bucorvus abyssinicus

Hornbills
Order: BucerotiformesFamily: Bucerotidae

Hornbills are a group of birds whose bill is shaped like a cow's horn, but without a twist, sometimes with a casque on the upper mandible. Frequently, the bill is brightly coloured.

Red-billed dwarf hornbill, Lophoceros camurus (A)
Crowned hornbill, Lophoceros alboterminatus
African pied hornbill, Lophoceros fasciatus
Hemprich's hornbill, Lophoceros hemprichii
African gray hornbill, Lophoceros nasutus
Eastern yellow-billed hornbill, Tockus flavirostris
Jackson's hornbill, Tockus jacksoni
Northern red-billed hornbill, Tockus erythrorhynchus
Black dwarf hornbill, Horizocerus hartlaubi
Black-casqued hornbill, Ceratogymna atrata (A)
Silvery-cheeked hornbill, Bycanistes brevis (A)
Black-and-white-casqued hornbill, Bycanistes subcylindricus
Piping hornbill, Bycanistes fistulator (A)

Kingfishers
Order: CoraciiformesFamily: Alcedinidae

Kingfishers are medium-sized birds with large heads, long, pointed bills, short legs and stubby tails.

Half-collared kingfisher, Alcedo semitorquata (A)
Shining-blue kingfisher, Alcedo quadribrachys (A)
Malachite kingfisher, Corythornis cristatus
African pygmy kingfisher, Ispidina picta
African dwarf kingfisher, Ispidina lecontei
Chocolate-backed kingfisher, Halcyon badia
Gray-headed kingfisher, Halcyon leucocephala
Woodland kingfisher, Halcyon senegalensis
Blue-breasted kingfisher, Halcyon malimbica
Striped kingfisher, Halcyon chelicuti
Giant kingfisher, Megaceryle maximus
Pied kingfisher, Ceryle rudis

Bee-eaters
Order: CoraciiformesFamily: Meropidae

The bee-eaters are a group of near passerine birds in the family Meropidae. Most species are found in Africa but others occur in southern Europe, Madagascar, Australia and New Guinea. They are characterised by richly coloured plumage, slender bodies and usually elongated central tail feathers. All are colourful and have long downturned bills and pointed wings, which give them a swallow-like appearance when seen from afar.

Red-throated bee-eater, Merops bulocki
Little bee-eater, Merops pusillus
Ethiopian bee-eater, Merops lafresnayii
Cinnamon-chested bee-eater, Merops oreobates
Swallow-tailed bee-eater, Merops hirundineus
Black-headed bee-eater, Merops breweri
White-throated bee-eater, Merops albicollis
African green bee-eater, Merops viridissimus
Blue-cheeked bee-eater, Merops persicus
Madagascar bee-eater, Merops superciliosus
European bee-eater, Merops apiaster
Northern carmine bee-eater, Merops nubicus

Rollers
Order: CoraciiformesFamily: Coraciidae

Rollers resemble crows in size and build, but are more closely related to the kingfishers and bee-eaters. They share the colourful appearance of those groups with blues and browns predominating. The two inner front toes are connected, but the outer toe is not.

European roller, Coracias garrulus
Abyssinian roller, Coracias abyssinica
Rufous-crowned roller, Coracias naevia
Blue-bellied roller, Coracias cyanogaster (A)
Broad-billed roller, Eurystomus glaucurus

African barbets
Order: PiciformesFamily: Lybiidae

The African barbets are plump birds, with short necks and large heads. They get their name from the bristles which fringe their heavy bills. Most species are brightly coloured.

Yellow-billed barbet, Trachyphonus purpuratus
Red-and-yellow barbet, Trachyphonus erythrocephalus
D'Arnaud's barbet, Trachyphonus darnaudii
Gray-throated barbet, Gymnobucco bonapartei
Yellow-rumped tinkerbird, Pogoniulus bilineatus
Red-fronted tinkerbird, Pogoniulus pusillus
Yellow-fronted tinkerbird, Pogoniulus chrysoconus
Hairy-breasted barbet, Tricholaema hirsuta
Red-fronted barbet, Tricholaema diademata
Spot-flanked barbet, Tricholaema lachrymosa
Black-throated barbet, Tricholaema melanocephala
Vieillot's barbet, Lybius vieilloti
White-headed barbet, Lybius leucocephalus
Black-billed barbet, Lybius guifsobalito
Double-toothed barbet, Lybius bidentatus
Black-breasted barbet, Lybius rolleti

Honeyguides
Order: PiciformesFamily: Indicatoridae

Honeyguides are among the few birds that feed on wax. They are named for the greater honeyguide which leads traditional honey-hunters to bees' nests and, after the hunters have harvested the honey, feeds on the remaining contents of the hive.

Cassin's honeyguide, Prodotiscus insignis
Least honeyguide, Indicator exilis
Lesser honeyguide, Indicator minor
Spotted honeyguide, Indicator maculatus (A)
Scaly-throated honeyguide, Indicator variegatus
Greater honeyguide, Indicator indicator

Woodpeckers
Order: PiciformesFamily: Picidae

Woodpeckers are small to medium-sized birds with chisel-like beaks, short legs, stiff tails and long tongues used for capturing insects. Some species have feet with two toes pointing forward and two backward, while several species have only three toes. Many woodpeckers have the habit of tapping noisily on tree trunks with their beaks.

Eurasian wryneck, Jynx torquilla
Rufous-necked wryneck, Jynx ruficollis (A)
Speckle-breasted woodpecker, Chloropicus poecilolaemus (A)
Cardinal woodpecker, Chloropicus fuscescens
Bearded woodpecker, Chloropicus namaquus
Golden-crowned woodpecker, Chloropicus xantholophus (A)
Brown-backed woodpecker, Chloropicus obsoletus
African gray woodpecker, Chloropicus goertae
Brown-eared woodpecker, Campethera caroli
Buff-spotted woodpecker, Campethera nivosa (A)
Green-backed woodpecker, Campethera cailliautii (A)
Nubian woodpecker, Campethera nubica
Fine-spotted woodpecker, Campethera punctuligera
Golden-tailed woodpecker, Campethera abingoni

Falcons and caracaras
Order: FalconiformesFamily: Falconidae

Falconidae is a family of diurnal birds of prey. They differ from hawks, eagles and kites in that they kill with their beaks instead of their talons.

Pygmy falcon, Polihierax semitorquatus
Eurasian kestrel, Falco tinnunculus
Fox kestrel, Falco alopex
Gray kestrel, Falco ardosiaceus
Red-necked falcon, Falco chicquera
Eleonora's falcon, Falco eleonorae
Eurasian hobby, Falco subbuteo
African hobby, Falco cuvierii (A)
Lanner falcon, Falco biarmicus
Saker falcon, Falco cherrug
Peregrine falcon, Falco peregrinus
Taita falcon, Falco fasciinucha (A)

Old World parrots
Order: PsittaciformesFamily: Psittaculidae

Characteristic features of parrots include a strong curved bill, an upright stance, strong legs, and clawed zygodactyl feet. Many parrots are vividly colored, and some are multi-colored. Old World parrots are found from Africa east across south and southeast Asia and Oceania to Australia and New Zealand.

Rose-ringed parakeet, Psittacula krameri
Red-headed lovebird, Agapornis pullarius

African and New World parrots
Order: PsittaciformesFamily: Psittacidae

Characteristic features of parrots include a strong curved bill, an upright stance, strong legs, and clawed zygodactyl feet. Many parrots are vividly colored, and some are multi-colored. Most of the more than 150 species in this family are found in the New World.

Meyer's parrot, Poicephalus meyeri
Niam-Niam parrot, Poicephalus crassus (A)

Cuckooshrikes
Order: PasseriformesFamily: Campephagidae

The cuckooshrikes are small to medium-sized passerine birds. They are predominantly greyish with white and black, although some species are brightly coloured.

Gray cuckooshrike, Coracina caesia
White-breasted cuckooshrike, Coracina pectoralis
Black cuckooshrike, Campephaga flava
Red-shouldered cuckooshrike, Campephaga phoenicea
Purple-throated cuckooshrike, Campephaga quiscalina

Old World orioles
Order: PasseriformesFamily: Oriolidae

The Old World orioles are colourful passerine birds. They are not related to the New World orioles.

Eurasian golden oriole, Oriolus oriolus
African golden oriole, Oriolus auratus
Western black-headed oriole, Oriolus brachyrhynchus (A) 
African black-headed oriole, Oriolus larvatus
Black-winged oriole, Oriolus nigripennis

Wattle-eyes and batises
Order: PasseriformesFamily: Platysteiridae

The wattle-eyes, or puffback flycatchers, are small stout passerine birds of the African tropics. They get their name from the brightly coloured fleshy eye decorations found in most species in this group.

Brown-throated wattle-eye, Platysteira cyanea
Chestnut wattle-eye, Platysteira castanea
Jameson's wattle-eye, Platysteira jamesoni
Chinspot batis, Batis molitor
Gray-headed batis, Batis orientalis
Western black-headed batis, Batis erlangeri
Pygmy batis, Batis perkeo

Vangas, helmetshrikes, and allies
Order: PasseriformesFamily: Vangidae

The helmetshrikes are similar in build to the shrikes, but tend to be colourful species with distinctive crests or other head ornaments, such as wattles, from which they get their name.

White helmetshrike, Prionops plumatus
African shrike-flycatcher, Megabyas flammulatus
Black-and-white shrike-flycatcher, Bias musicus

Bushshrikes and allies
Order: PasseriformesFamily: Malaconotidae

Bushshrikes are similar in habits to shrikes, hunting insects and other small prey from a perch on a bush. Although similar in build to the shrikes, these tend to be either colourful species or largely black; some species are quite secretive.

Brubru, Nilaus afer
Northern puffback, Dryoscopus gambensis
Pink-footed puffback, Dryoscopus angolensis (A)
Marsh tchagra, Tchagra minuta
Black-crowned tchagra, Tchagra senegala
Brown-crowned tchagra, Tchagra australis
Three-streaked tchagra, Tchagra jamesi
Lühder's bushshrike, Laniarius luehderi (A)
Ethiopian boubou, Laniarius aethiopicus
Tropical boubou, Laniarius major
Black-headed gonolek, Laniarius erythrogaster
Slate-colored boubou, Laniarius funebris
Lowland sooty boubou, Laniarius leucorhynchus (A)
Rosy-patched bushshrike, Rhodophoneus cruentus
Sulphur-breasted bushshrike, Telophorus sulfureopectus
Gray-headed bushshrike, Malaconotus blanchoti

Drongos
Order: PasseriformesFamily: Dicruridae

The drongos are mostly black or dark grey in colour, sometimes with metallic tints. They have long forked tails, and some Asian species have elaborate tail decorations. They have short legs and sit very upright when perched, like a shrike. They flycatch or take prey from the ground.

Sharpe's drongo, Dicrurus sharpei
Glossy-backed drongo, Dicrurus divaricatus
Velvet-mantled drongo, Dicrurus modestus

Monarch flycatchers
Order: PasseriformesFamily: Monarchidae

The monarch flycatchers are small to medium-sized insectivorous passerines which hunt by flycatching.

Blue-headed crested-flycatcher, Trochocercus nitens (A)
African paradise-flycatcher, Terpsiphone viridis

Shrikes
Order: PasseriformesFamily: Laniidae

Shrikes are passerine birds known for their habit of catching other birds and small animals and impaling the uneaten portions of their bodies on thorns. A typical shrike's beak is hooked, like a bird of prey.

Red-backed shrike, Lanius collurio
Red-tailed shrike, Lanius phoenicuroides
Isabelline shrike, Lanius isabellinus
Emin's shrike, Lanius gubernator
Great gray shrike, Lanius excubitor
Lesser gray shrike, Lanius minor (A)
Gray-backed fiscal, Lanius excubitoroides
Yellow-billed shrike, Lanius corvinus
Taita fiscal, Lanius dorsalis
Somali fiscal, Lanius somalicus (A)
Northern fiscal, Lanius humeralis
Masked shrike, Lanius nubicus
Woodchat shrike, Lanius senator
White-rumped shrike, Eurocephalus ruppelli

Crows, jays, and magpies
Order: PasseriformesFamily: Corvidae

The family Corvidae includes crows, ravens, jays, choughs, magpies, treepies, nutcrackers and ground jays. Corvids are above average in size among the Passeriformes, and some of the larger species show high levels of intelligence.

Piapiac, Ptilostomus afer
Cape crow, Corvus capensis
Pied crow, Corvus albus
Somali crow, Corvus edithae
Fan-tailed raven, Corvus rhipidurus
White-necked raven, Corvus albicollis (A)

Hyliotas
Order: PasseriformesFamily: Hyliotidae

The members of this small family, all of genus Hyliota, are birds of the forest canopy. They tend to feed in mixed-species flocks.

Yellow-bellied hyliota, Hyliota flavigaster

Fairy flycatchers
Order: PasseriformesFamily: Stenostiridae

Most of the species of this small family are found in Africa, though a few inhabit tropical Asia. They are not closely related to other birds called "flycatchers".

African blue flycatcher, Elminia longicauda
Dusky crested-flycatcher, Elminia nigromitrata (A)

Tits, chickadees, and titmice
Order: PasseriformesFamily: Paridae

The Paridae are mainly small stocky woodland species with short stout bills. Some have crests. They are adaptable birds, with a mixed diet including seeds and insects.

White-shouldered black-tit, Melaniparus guineensis
White-bellied tit, Melaniparus albiventris
Dusky tit, Melaniparus funereus (A)

Penduline-tits
Order: PasseriformesFamily: Remizidae

The penduline-tits are a group of small passerine birds related to the true tits. They are insectivores.

Sennar penduline-tit, Anthoscopus punctifrons
Mouse-coloured penduline-tit, Anthoscopus musculus
Yellow penduline-tit, Anthoscopus parvulus

Larks
Order: PasseriformesFamily: Alaudidae

Larks are small terrestrial birds with often extravagant songs and display flights. Most larks are fairly dull in appearance. Their food is insects and seeds. There are 14 species which have been recorded in South Sudan.

Rufous-rumped lark, Pinarocorys erythropygia
Chestnut-backed sparrow-lark, Eremopterix leucotis
Black-crowned sparrow-lark, Eremopterix nigriceps
Chestnut-headed sparrow-lark, Eremopterix signatus
Pink-breasted Lark, Calendulauda poecilosterna
Red-winged lark, Mirafra hypermetra
Flappet lark, Mirafra rufocinnamomea
Kordofan lark, Mirafra cordofanica (A)
White-tailed lark, Mirafra albicauda
Horsfield’s bushlark, Mirafra javanica
Greater short-toed lark, Calandrella brachydactyla
Sun lark, Galerida modesta

Nicators
Order: PasseriformesFamily: Nicatoridae

The nicators are shrike-like, with hooked bills. They are endemic to sub-Saharan Africa.

Western nicator, Nicator chloris

African warblers
Order: PasseriformesFamily: Macrosphenidae

African warblers are small to medium-sized insectivores which are found in a wide variety of habitats south of the Sahara.

Green crombec, Sylvietta virens
Northern crombec, Sylvietta brachyura
Red-faced crombec, Sylvietta whytii
Moustached grass-warbler, Melocichla mentalis
Yellow longbill, Macrosphenus flavicans
Green hylia, Hylia prasina

Cisticolas and allies
Order: PasseriformesFamily: Cisticolidae

The Cisticolidae are warblers found mainly in warmer southern regions of the Old World. They are generally very small birds of drab brown or grey appearance found in open country such as grassland or scrub.

Yellow-bellied eremomela, Eremomela icteropygialis
Green-backed eremomela, Eremomela canescens
Rufous-crowned eremomela, Eremomela badiceps (A)
Red-winged gray warbler, Drymocichla incana
White-chinned prinia, Schistolais leucopogon
Black-collared apalis, Oreolais pulchra
Gray wren-warbler, Calamonastes simplex
Green-backed camaroptera, Camaroptera brachyura
Yellow-browed camaroptera, Camaroptera superciliaris (A)
Olive-green camaroptera, Camaroptera chloronota (A)
Buff-bellied warbler, Phyllolais pulchella
Black-throated apalis, Apalis jacksoni
Yellow-breasted apalis, Apalis flavida
Buff-throated apalis, Apalis rufogularis
Gray apalis, Apalis cinerea
Tawny-flanked prinia, Prinia subflava
Pale prinia, Prinia somalica
Red-winged prinia, Prinia erythroptera (A)
Red-fronted prinia, Prinia rufifrons
Black-faced rufous-warbler, Bathmocercus rufus
Gray-capped warbler, Eminia lepida (A)
Red-faced cisticola, Cisticola erythrops
Singing cisticola, Cisticola cantans
Whistling cisticola, Cisticola lateralis
Rock-loving cisticola, Cisticola aberrans
Boran cisticola, Cisticola bodessa
Rattling cisticola, Cisticola chiniana
Ashy cisticola, Cisticola cinereolus (A)
Red-pate cisticola, Cisticola ruficeps
Winding cisticola, Cisticola marginatus
Stout cisticola, Cisticola robustus (A)
Croaking cisticola, Cisticola natalensis'
Siffling cisticola, Cisticola brachypterusFoxy cisticola, Cisticola troglodytesTiny cisticola, Cisticola nana (A)
Zitting cisticola, Cisticola juncidisDesert cisticola, Cisticola aridulusBlack-backed cisticola, Cisticola eximiusWing-snapping cisticola, Cisticola ayresiiReed warblers and allies
Order: PasseriformesFamily: Acrocephalidae

The members of this family are usually rather large for "warblers". Most are rather plain olivaceous brown above with much yellow to beige below. They are usually found in open woodland, reedbeds, or tall grass. The family occurs mostly in southern to western Eurasia and surroundings, but it also ranges far into the Pacific, with some species in Africa.

Eastern olivaceous warbler, Iduna pallidaAfrican yellow-warbler, Iduna natalensisMountain yellow-warbler, Iduna similisUpcher's warbler, Hippolais languida (A)
Icterine warbler, Hippolais icterina (A)
Sedge warbler, Acrocephalus schoenobaenusCommon reed warbler, Acrocephalus scirpaceusBasra reed warbler, Acrocephalus griseldisLesser swamp warbler, Acrocephalus gracilirostrisGreater swamp warbler, Acrocephalus rufescensGreat reed warbler, Acrocephalus arundinaceusGrassbirds and allies
Order: PasseriformesFamily: Locustellidae

Locustellidae are a family of small insectivorous songbirds found mainly in Eurasia, Africa, and the Australian region. They are smallish birds with tails that are usually long and pointed, and tend to be drab brownish or buffy all over.

Bamboo warbler, Locustella alfrediSavi's warbler, Locustella luscinioidesFan-tailed grassbird, Catriscus brevirostrisCinnamon bracken-warbler, Bradypterus cinnamomeusHighland rush warbler, Bradypterus centralisSwallows
Order: PasseriformesFamily: Hirundinidae

The family Hirundinidae is adapted to aerial feeding. They have a slender streamlined body, long pointed wings and a short bill with a wide gape. The feet are adapted to perching rather than walking, and the front toes are partially joined at the base.

Plain martin, Riparia paludicolaBank swallow, Riparia ripariaBanded martin, Neophedina cinctaRock martin, Ptyonoprogne fuligulaBarn swallow, Hirundo rusticaEthiopian swallow, Hirundo aethiopicaWire-tailed swallow, Hirundo smithiiRed-rumped swallow, Cecropis dauricaLesser striped swallow, Cecropis abyssinicaRufous-chested swallow, Cecropis semirufaMosque swallow, Cecropis senegalensisCommon house-martin, Delichon urbicumWhite-headed sawwing, Psalidoprocne albicepsBlack sawwing, Psalidoprocne pristopteraGray-rumped swallow, Pseudhirundo griseopygaBulbuls
Order: PasseriformesFamily: Pycnonotidae

Bulbuls are medium-sized songbirds. Some are colourful with yellow, red or orange vents, cheeks, throats or supercilia, but most are drab, with uniform olive-brown to black plumage. Some species have distinct crests.

Slender-billed greenbul, Stelgidillas gracilirostrisRed-tailed bristlebill, Bleda syndactylusLesser bristlebill, Bleda notatusSimple greenbul, Chlorocichla simplex (A)
Joyful greenbul, Chlorocichla laetissimaHoneyguide greenbul, Baeopogon indicatorYellow-throated greenbul, Atimastillas flavicollisRed-tailed greenbul, Criniger calurusPlain greenbul, Eurillas curvirostris'
Yellow-whiskered greenbul, Eurillas latirostris
Little greenbul, Eurillas virensLeaf-love, Phyllastrephus scandens
Northern brownbul, Phyllastrephus strepitans
Toro olive-greenbul, Phyllastrephus hypochloris
Cabanis's greenbul, Phyllastrephus cabanisi
White-throated greenbul, Phyllastrephus albigularis
Common bulbul, Pycnonotus barbatus

Leaf warblersOrder: PasseriformesFamily: Phylloscopidae

Leaf warblers are a family of small insectivorous birds found mostly in Eurasia and ranging into Wallacea and Africa. The species are of various sizes, often green-plumaged above and yellow below, or more subdued with grayish-green to grayish-brown colors.

Wood warbler, Phylloscopus sibilatrix
Eastern Bonelli's warbler, Phylloscopus orientalis
Willow warbler, Phylloscopus trochilus
Common chiffchaff, Phylloscopus collybita
Brown woodland-warbler, Phylloscopus umbrovirens

Sylviid warblers, parrotbills, and alliesOrder: PasseriformesFamily: Sylviidae

The family Sylviidae is a group of small insectivorous passerine birds. They mainly occur as breeding species, as the common name implies, in Europe, Asia and, to a lesser extent, Africa. Most are of generally undistinguished appearance, but many have distinctive songs.

Eurasian blackcap, Sylvia atricapilla
Garden warbler, Sylvia borin
African hill babbler, Sylvia abyssinica
Barred warbler, Curruca nisoria
Lesser whitethroat, Curruca curruca
Brown parisoma, Curruca lugens
Eastern Orphean warbler, Curruca crassirostris
Greater whitethroat, Curruca communis

White-eyes, yuhinas, and alliesOrder: PasseriformesFamily: Zosteropidae

The white-eyes are small and mostly undistinguished, their plumage above being generally some dull colour like greenish-olive, but some species have a white or bright yellow throat, breast or lower parts, and several have buff flanks. As their name suggests, many species have a white ring around each eye.

Abyssinian white-eye, Zosterops abyssinicus
Northern yellow white-eye, Zosterops senegalensis

Ground babblersOrder: PasseriformesFamily: Pellorneidae

These small to medium-sized songbirds have soft fluffy plumage but are otherwise rather diverse. Members of the genus Illadopsis are found in forests, but some other genera are birds of scrublands.

Brown illadopsis, Illadopsis fulvescens
Scaly-breasted illadopsis, Illadopsis albipectus
Thrush babbler, Illadopsis turdina (A)
Puvel's illadopsis, Illadopsis puveli

Laughingthrushes and alliesOrder: PasseriformesFamily: Leiothrichidae

The members of this family are diverse in size and coloration, though those of genus Turdoides tend to be brown or grayish. The family is found in Africa, India, and southeast Asia.

Rufous chatterer, Argya rubiginosa
Brown babbler, Turdoides plebejus
White-rumped babbler, Turdoides leucopygia
Dusky babbler, Turdoides tenebrosa

TreecreepersOrder: PasseriformesFamily: Certhiidae

Treecreepers are small woodland birds, brown above and white below. They have thin pointed down-curved bills, which they use to extricate insects from bark. They have stiff tail feathers, like woodpeckers, which they use to support themselves on vertical trees.

African spotted creeper, Salpornis salvadori

OxpeckersOrder: PasseriformesFamily: Buphagidae

As both the English and scientific names of these birds imply, they feed on ectoparasites, primarily ticks, found on large mammals.

Red-billed oxpecker, Buphagus erythrorhynchus
Yellow-billed oxpecker, Buphagus africanus

StarlingsOrder: PasseriformesFamily: Sturnidae

Starlings are small to medium-sized passerine birds. Their flight is strong and direct and they are very gregarious. Their preferred habitat is fairly open country. They eat insects and fruit. Plumage is typically dark with a metallic sheen.

Wattled starling, Creatophora cinerea
Violet-backed starling, Cinnyricinclus leucogaster
Red-winged starling, Onychognathus morio (A)
Waller's starling, Onychognathus walleri
Magpie starling, Speculipastor bicolor (A)
Sharpe's starling, Speculipastor sharpii
Stuhlmann's starling, Poeoptera stuhlmanni (A)
Shelley's starling, Lamprotornis shelleyi
Rüppell's starling, Lamprotornis purpuropterus
Long-tailed glossy starling, Lamprotornis caudatus
Splendid starling, Lamprotornis splendidus
Superb starling, Lamprotornis superbus
Chestnut-bellied starling, Lamprotornis pulcher (A)
Lesser blue-eared starling, Lamprotornis chloropterus
Greater blue-eared starling, Lamprotornis chalybaeus
Purple starling, Lamprotornis purpureus
Bronze-tailed starling, Lamprotornis chalcurus

Thrushes and alliesOrder: PasseriformesFamily: Turdidae

The thrushes are a group of passerine birds that occur mainly in the Old World. They are plump, soft plumaged, small to medium-sized insectivores or sometimes omnivores, often feeding on the ground. Many have attractive songs.

Rufous flycatcher-thrush, Neocossyphus fraseri
Spotted ground-thrush, Geokichla guttata (A)
Abyssinian ground-thrush, Geokichla piaggiae
Abyssinian thrush, Turdus abyssinicus
African thrush, Turdus pelios

Old World flycatchersOrder: PasseriformesFamily: Muscicapidae

Old World flycatchers are a large group of small passerine birds native to the Old World. They are mainly small arboreal insectivores. The appearance of these birds is highly varied, but they mostly have weak songs and harsh calls.

African dusky flycatcher, Muscicapa adusta
Spotted flycatcher, Muscicapa striata
Gambaga flycatcher, Muscicapa gambagae
Swamp flycatcher, Muscicapa aquatica
Sooty flycatcher, Bradornis fuliginosus
Dusky-blue flycatcher, Bradornis comitatus
African gray flycatcher, Bradornis microrhynchus
Pale flycatcher, Agricola pallidus
Gray tit-flycatcher, Fraseria plumbea
Ashy flycatcher, Fraseria caerulescens
Silverbird, Melaenornis semipartitus
Northern black-flycatcher, Melaenornis edolioides
White-eyed slaty-flycatcher, Melaenornis fischeri
Fire-crested alethe, Alethe castanea
Black scrub-robin, Cercotrichas podobe
Rufous-tailed scrub-robin, Cercotrichas galactotes
Red-backed scrub-robin, Cercotrichas leucophrys
Cape robin-chat, Cossypha caffra
Blue-shouldered robin-chat, Cossypha cyanocampter
Gray-winged robin-chat, Cossypha polioptera
Rüppell's robin-chat, Cossypha semirufa
White-browed robin-chat, Cossypha heuglini
Red-capped robin-chat, Cossypha natalensis
Snowy-crowned robin-chat, Cossypha niveicapilla
White-crowned robin-chat, Cossypha albicapilla (A)
Spotted morning-thrush, Cichladusa guttata
White-starred robin, Pogonocichla stellata
Brown-chested alethe, Chamaetylas poliocephala (A)
Yellow-breasted forest robin, Stiphrornis mabirae (A)
Equatorial akalat, Sheppardia aequatorialis (A)
Thrush nightingale, Luscinia luscinia
Common nightingale, Luscinia megarhynchos
Bluethroat, Luscinia svecica
Semicollared flycatcher, Ficedula semitorquata
Common redstart, Phoenicurus phoenicurus
Little rock-thrush, Monticola rufocinereus
Rufous-tailed rock-thrush, Monticola saxatilis
Blue rock-thrush, Monticola solitarius (A)
Whinchat, Saxicola rubetra
Siberian stonechat, Saxicola maurus
African stonechat, Saxicola torquatus
Mocking cliff-chat, Thamnolaea cinnamomeiventris
Sooty chat, Myrmecocichla nigra
Northern wheatear, Oenanthe oenanthe
Isabelline wheatear, Oenanthe isabellina
Heuglin's wheatear, Oenanthe heuglini
Desert wheatear, Oenanthe deserti
Eastern black-eared wheatear, Oenanthe melanoleuca
Pied wheatear, Oenanthe pleschanka
White-fronted black-chat, Oenanthe albifrons
Familiar chat, Oenanthe familiaris
Brown-tailed chat, Oenanthe scotocerca

Sunbirds and spiderhuntersOrder: PasseriformesFamily: Nectariniidae

The sunbirds and spiderhunters are very small passerine birds which feed largely on nectar, although they will also take insects, especially when feeding young. Flight is fast and direct on their short wings. Most species can take nectar by hovering like a hummingbird, but usually perch to feed.

Western violet-backed sunbird, Anthreptes longuemarei
Eastern violet-backed sunbird, Anthreptes orientalis
Little green sunbird, Anthreptes seimundi (A)
Green sunbird, Anthreptes rectirostris (A)
Collared sunbird, Hedydipna collaris
Pygmy sunbird, Hedydipna platura
Green-headed sunbird, Cyanomitra verticalis
Olive sunbird, Cyanomitra olivacea
Green-throated sunbird, Chalcomitra rubescens
Amethyst sunbird, Chalcomitra amethystina (A)
Scarlet-chested sunbird, Chalcomitra senegalensis
Hunter's sunbird, Chalcomitra hunteri (A)
Tacazze sunbird, Nectarinia tacazze
Malachite sunbird, Nectarinia famosa (A)
Olive-bellied sunbird, Cinnyris chloropygius (A)
Northern double-collared sunbird, Cinnyris reichenowi
Beautiful sunbird, Cinnyris pulchellus
Mariqua sunbird, Cinnyris mariquensis (A)
Red-chested sunbird, Cinnyris erythrocerca
Palestine sunbird, Cinnyris oseus
Shining sunbird, Cinnyris habessinicus (A)
Splendid sunbird, Cinnyris coccinigaster
Variable sunbird, Cinnyris venustus
Copper sunbird, Cinnyris cupreus

Weavers and alliesOrder: PasseriformesFamily: Ploceidae

The weavers are small passerine birds related to the finches. They are seed-eating birds with rounded conical bills. The males of many species are brightly coloured, usually in red or yellow and black, some species show variation in colour only in the breeding season.

White-billed buffalo-weaver, Bubalornis albirostris
Red-billed buffalo-weaver, Bubalornis niger
White-headed buffalo-weaver, Dinemellia dinemelli
Speckle-fronted weaver, Sporopipes frontalis 
White-browed sparrow-weaver, Plocepasser mahali
Chestnut-crowned sparrow-weaver, Plocepasser superciliosus
Gray-headed social-weaver, Pseudonigrita arnaudi (A)
Red-bellied malimbe, Malimbus erythrogaster (A)
Blue-billed malimbe, Malimbus nitens (A)
Red-headed malimbe, Malimbus rubricollis (A)
Red-headed weaver, Anaplectes rubriceps 
Baglafecht weaver, Ploceus baglafecht
Little weaver, Ploceus luteolus
Black-necked weaver, Ploceus nigricollis
Spectacled weaver, Ploceus ocularis
Black-billed weaver, Ploceus melanogaster
Northern masked-weaver, Ploceus taeniopterus
Lesser masked-weaver, Ploceus intermedius
Vitelline masked-weaver, Ploceus vitellinus
Heuglin's masked-weaver, Ploceus heuglini
Rüppell's weaver, Ploceus galbula (A)
Vieillot's black weaver, Ploceus nigerrimus
Village weaver, Ploceus cucullatus
Black-headed weaver, Ploceus melanocephalus
Golden-backed weaver, Ploceus jacksoni
Chestnut weaver, Ploceus rubiginosus
Cinnamon weaver, Ploceus badius
Yellow-mantled weaver, Ploceus tricolor (A)
Forest weaver, Ploceus bicolor (A)
Brown-capped weaver, Ploceus insignis
Compact weaver, Pachyphantes superciliosus
Cardinal quelea, Quelea cardinalis
Red-headed quelea, Quelea erythrops
Red-billed quelea, Quelea quelea
Northern red bishop, Euplectes franciscanus
Black-winged bishop, Euplectes hordeaceus
Black bishop, Euplectes gierowii
Yellow-crowned bishop, Euplectes afer
Yellow bishop, Euplectes capensis
White-winged widowbird, Euplectes albonotatus (A)
Yellow-mantled widowbird, Euplectes macroura
Red-collared widowbird, Euplectes ardens
Red-cowled widowbird, Euplectes laticauda
Fan-tailed widowbird, Euplectes axillaris
Grosbeak weaver, Amblyospiza albifrons

Waxbills and alliesOrder: PasseriformesFamily: Estrildidae

The estrildid finches are small passerine birds of the Old World tropics and Australasia. They are gregarious and often colonial seed eaters with short thick but pointed bills. They are all similar in structure and habits, but have wide variation in plumage colours and patterns.

Gray-headed silverbill, Spermestes griseicapilla
Bronze mannikin, Spermestes cucullatus
Magpie mannikin, Spermestes fringilloides
Black-and-white mannikin, Spermestes bicolor
African silverbill, Euodice cantans
Yellow-bellied waxbill, Coccopygia quartinia
Green-backed twinspot, Mandingoa nitidula
Abyssinian crimsonwing, Cryptospiza salvadorii
Gray-headed nigrita, Nigrita canicapilla
Gray-headed oliveback, Delacourella capistrata (A)
Black-faced waxbill, Brunhilda erythronotos
Black-cheeked waxbill, Brunhilda charmosyna (A)
Black-crowned waxbill, Estrilda nonnula
Fawn-breasted waxbill, Estrilda paludicola
Common waxbill, Estrilda astrild
Black-rumped waxbill, Estrilda troglodytes
Crimson-rumped waxbill, Estrilda rhodopyga
Quailfinch, Ortygospiza atricollis
Cut-throat, Amadina fasciata
Zebra waxbill, Amandava subflava
Purple grenadier, Granatina ianthinogaster
Red-cheeked cordonbleu, Uraeginthus bengalus
Blue-capped cordonbleu, Uraeginthus cyanocephalus (A)
Red-headed bluebill, Spermophaga ruficapilla
Black-bellied seedcracker, Pyrenestes ostrinus (A)
Green-winged pytilia, Pytilia melba
Orange-winged pytilia, Pytilia afra (A)
Red-winged pytilia, Pytilia phoenicoptera
Red-billed pytilia, Pytilia lineata (A)
Dybowski's twinspot, Euschistospiza dybowskii
Brown twinspot, Clytospiza monteiri
Red-billed firefinch, Lagonosticta senegala
African firefinch, Lagonosticta rubricata
Jameson's firefinch, Lagonosticta rhodopareia
Black-bellied firefinch, Lagonosticta rara
Bar-breasted firefinch, Lagonosticta rufopicta
Black-faced firefinch, Lagonosticta larvata

IndigobirdsOrder: PasseriformesFamily: Viduidae

The indigobirds are finch-like species which usually have black or indigo predominating in their plumage. All are brood parasites, which lay their eggs in the nests of estrildid finches.

Pin-tailed whydah, Vidua macroura
Sahel paradise-whydah, Vidua orientalis
Exclamatory paradise-whydah, Vidua interjecta
Eastern paradise-whydah, Vidua paradisaea
Steel-blue whydah, Vidua hypocherina (A)
Straw-tailed whydah, Vidua fischeri
Village indigobird, Vidua chalybeata
Wilson's indigobird, Vidua wilsoni
Quailfinch indigobird, Vidua nigeriae
Jambandu indigobird, Vidua raricola
Baka indigobird, Vidua larvaticola
Cameroon indigobird, Vidua camerunensis
Parasitic weaver, Anomalospiza imberbis

Old World sparrowsOrder: PasseriformesFamily: Passeridae

Old World sparrows are small passerine birds. In general, sparrows tend to be small, plump, brown or grey birds with short tails and short powerful beaks. Sparrows are seed eaters, but they also consume small insects. There are 11 species which have been recorded in South Sudan.

House sparrow, Passer domesticus (I)
Shelley's rufous sparrow, Passer shelleyi
Northern gray-headed sparrow, Passer griseus
Swainson's sparrow, Passer swainsonii
Parrot-billed sparrow, Passer gongonensis
Sudan golden sparrow, Passer luteus
Chestnut sparrow, Passer eminibey
Yellow-spotted bush sparrow, Gymnoris pyrgita
Sahel bush sparrow, Gymnoris dentata

Wagtails and pipitsOrder: PasseriformesFamily: Motacillidae

Motacillidae is a family of small passerine birds with medium to long tails. They include the wagtails, longclaws and pipits. They are slender, ground feeding insectivores of open country.

Gray wagtail, Motacilla cinerea
Western yellow wagtail, Motacilla flava
African pied wagtail, Motacilla aguimp
White wagtail, Motacilla alba
African pipit, Anthus cinnamomeus
Long-billed pipit, Anthus similis
Tawny pipit, Anthus campestris (A)
Plain-backed pipit, Anthus leucophrys
Tree pipit, Anthus trivialis
Red-throated pipit, Anthus cervinus
Golden pipit, Tmetothylacus tenellus
Yellow-throated longclaw, Macronyx croceus

Finches, euphonias, and alliesOrder: PasseriformesFamily: Fringillidae

Finches are seed-eating passerine birds, that are small to moderately large and have a strong beak, usually conical and in some species very large. All have twelve tail feathers and nine primaries. These birds have a bouncing flight with alternating bouts of flapping and gliding on closed wings, and most sing well.

Oriole finch, Linurgus olivaceus (A)
White-rumped seedeater, Crithagra leucopygius
Yellow-fronted canary, Crithagra mozambicus
African citril, Crithagra citrinelloides
Southern citril, Crithagra hypostictus
Reichenow's seedeater, Crithagra reichenowi
White-bellied canary, Crithagra dorsostriatus (A)
Streaky seedeater, Crithagra striolatus
Reichard's seedeater, Crithagra reichardi
Yellow-crowned canary, Serinus flavivertex (A)

Old World buntingsOrder: PasseriformesFamily''': Emberizidae

The emberizids are a large family of passerine birds. They are seed-eating birds with distinctively shaped bills. Many emberizid species have distinctive head patterns. There are 6 species which have been recorded in South Sudan.

Brown-rumped bunting, Emberiza affinisCabanis's bunting, Emberiza cabanisiGolden-breasted bunting, Emberiza flaviventrisSomali bunting, Emberiza poliopleuraCinnamon-breasted bunting, Emberiza tahapisiGosling's bunting, Emberiza goslingiStriolated bunting, Emberiza striolata'' (A)

See also
List of birds
Lists of birds by region
List of mammals of South Sudan

References

South Sudan
South Sudan
Birds
South Sudan